The 1937 Central Michigan Bearcats football team represented Central Michigan College of Education, later renamed Central Michigan University, as an independent during the 1937 college football season. In their first season under head coach Ron Finch, the Bearcats compiled a 6–2 record, shut out four of eight opponents, held six opponents to seven or fewer points, and outscored their opponents by a combined total of 202 to 41. The team's sole losses were to Wayne State (0–18) and Western State (0–7).

Coach Finch was hired as the school's head coach in March 1937. He was a Central Michigan alumnus who had coached at high schools in Saginaw, St. Joseph, and Lowell, Michigan.

Schedule

References

External links
 1938 Chippewa yearbook

Central Michigan
Central Michigan Chippewas football seasons
Central Michigan Bearcats football